Antonio Perduca (born May 7, 1905) was an Italian professional football player.

1905 births
Year of death missing
Italian footballers
Serie A players
F.C. Pavia players
Atalanta B.C. players
A.C. Legnano players
Inter Milan players
S.S.C. Bari players
S.S.D. Lucchese 1905 players
Association football defenders